The Pop 100 was a songs chart that debuted in February 2005 and was released weekly by Billboard magazine in the United States until its discontinuation in 2009.  It ranked songs based on airplay on Mainstream Top 40 radio stations, singles sales and digital downloads.

History
The Pop 100 was conceived by Michael Ellis and was first published in the Billboard issue of February 12, 2005. It was created to focus "on the songs with the greatest mainstream appeal, while the Hot 100 will be driven by the songs with the highest song rotations," according to Billboard chart editor Geoff Mayfield. In a press release about the new chart, he also stated that "the Pop 100's construction also makes sense when you notice the high correlation between the songs with the most top 40 plays and the best selling digital tracks."

The Pop 100 used only Mainstream radio impressions data, derived from the Pop 100 Airplay chart. Its calculation also considered digital and physical sales. When the Pop 100 was first published, the Hot 100 changed its format as well. Digital downloads were incorporated into the equation which tabulates a song's rank on the chart. Prior to this, only radio airplay and physical singles sales were used to determine positions.

Pop 100 Airplay
The Pop 100 Airplay chart was created alongside the Pop 100. It measured airplay over top 40 radio stations and was the successor to Top 40 Tracks, the Billboard chart that formerly tracked airplay of those stations after the Hot 100 panel was expanded to include a broader range of stations.

Pop 100 Airplay was often mistaken and confused with the Mainstream Top 40 chart. Like the Mainstream Top 40, the Pop 100 Airplay also measured airplay of songs on mainstream radio stations playing pop-oriented music, but the Pop 100 Airplay (like the Hot 100 Airplay) measured airplay based on statistical audience impressions, while the Mainstream Top 40 uses the number of total detections (spins).

Discontinuation
On June 10, 2009, the Pop 100 was discontinued by Billboard: "In place of the chart, which launched in 2005 and more recently had more mirrored the Hot 100 in light of heightened digital sales, the airplay-only plays-based Mainstream Top 40 survey, which began in 1992, will track the progress of songs across U.S. Top 40 radio." Since digital sales have become a bigger factor in the compilation of the Hot 100, the dominance of R&B and hip hop on that chart has reduced, which in large part had rendered the Pop 100 redundant. The Pop 100 continued to be published on billboard.biz until June 26, 2010.

List of Pop 100 number-one singles
This is a complete list of the songs that reached number one on the Pop 100 chart from its inception in February 2005 through it discontinuation in June 2009. Its airplay points were compiled from electronic monitoring of approximately 115 mainstream Top 40 stations by Nielsen Broadcast Data Systems.

The chart debuted in the issue dated February 12, 2005, with the first number one being "1, 2 Step" by Ciara featuring Missy Elliott. The number-one song on the final chart in the issue dated June 27, 2009, was "Boom Boom Pow" by The Black Eyed Peas.

 ↓↑ - indicates song's run at number one was non-consecutive

References

Billboard charts
2005 establishments in the United States
2009 disestablishments in the United States